Rancho Campana High School is an 800 student comprehensive academy high school for grades 9-12 that was built in 2015. The high school is located in Camarillo, California which is part of the Oxnard Union High School District. The  provides public education for the Camarillo and Somis communities.

The high school divides students in their freshmen year amongst three academies: Academy of Engineering, Academy of Arts and Engineering and Entertainment, and Academy of Medical Sciences. Each academy provides specific course requirements, field trips, educational and job shadow opportunities. Due to a limited amount of space on the new campus as well as a limited amount of resources and technology, each year the two-hundred incoming freshmen are determined through a lottery.

The first graduating class was in June 2018 when 130 students in the Senior Class graduated.

The school received funding in 2018 for updating facilities through a local Bond Measure. The school also received funds to expand the school's student capacity with 9 relocatable classrooms.

References

External links

Rancho Campana High School
Educational institutions established in 2015
Public high schools in California
2015 establishments in California
Buildings and structures in Camarillo, California